Kjerulf (Kjærulf, Kjærulff, Kierulff, Kierulf, Kiærulff, Kiærulf, Kærulf or Kjaerulf) is a Danish surname. Notable people with the surname include:

People
Theodor Kjerulf (1825–1888), Norwegian geologist
Halfdan Kjerulf (1815–1868), Norwegian composer
Charles Kjerulf (1858–1919), Danish composer
Axel Kjerulf (1884–1964), Danish composer

Places
Kjerulf Fjord, NE Greenland
Kjerulf Glacier, South Georgia
Kjerulfbreen, Svalbard
Kjerulf Glacier (Jan Mayen), Jan Mayen
Kjerulføya, island in Svalbard

Danish-language surnames